Agape Europe is the Western European ministry of Cru, an interdenominational movement that was founded in 1951 in the United States of America. "Agape" is the Greek word used in the Bible for God's unconditional love. Agape became a worldwide organisation , and around 20,000 people have joined Agape Europe.

Agape Europe, currently headquartered in Kandern, Germany and Barcelona, Spain, has ministries for students in universities and secondary schools, sports, media, families, communities, churches, musicians, leaders and much more.

External links
Agape Europe's ministries
Agape Europe member countries

Leadership
Agape Europe has been directed by the following leaders:
Gordon Klenck 1966 - 1977
Kalevi Lehtinen 1977 - 1987
Leo Habets 1987 - 1996 
Markku Happonen 1996 - 2006
Javier García - 2006–present

References

Evangelical parachurch organizations
Christian organizations established in the 21st century